Zaeske is a surname. Notable people with the surname include:

Lou Zaeske (1941–2011), American mechanical engineer
Paul Zaeske (1945–1992), American football player